Sentraltind (also known as Sentraltinden or Vestre Styggedalstind) is a mountain in the Hurrungane mountains in the Jotunheimen mountain range. It is the 10th highest summit in Norway. Sentraltind lies on a ridge between Store Skagastølstind-Vetle Skagastølstind and Store Styggedalstind-Jervvasstind.

Name
The first element is the loan word sentral which means "central" and the last element is the finite form of tind which means "mountain peak". The name is not very old.

See also
List of mountains of Norway

References

Mountains of Vestland
Jotunheimen
Luster, Norway